Prudishchi is a rural locality (a village) in Borisoglebskoye Rural Settlement, Muromsky District, Vladimir Oblast, Russia. The population was 265 as of 2010. There are 6 streets.

Geography 
Prudishchi is located 28 km northwest of Murom (the district's administrative centre) by road. Sovanchakovo is the nearest rural locality.

References 

Rural localities in Muromsky District